Delphine Haidan is a contemporary French mezzo-soprano.

Career 
Trained by choral conductor Jacques Grimbert and holder of a Master's degree in musicology from the Sorbonne, Delphine Haidan won an opera prize at the Conservatoire de Paris and several prizes in international competitions. She then entered the École d'art lyrique of the Paris Opera and was engaged by the Opéra in Peer Gynt under the direction of Neeme Järvi and Stravinsky's Les noces. In 1998, she was selected at the Victoires de la musique classique. The same year she sang the role of Mallika in Delibes' Lakmé alongside Natalie Dessay (Lakmé) under the direction of Michel Plasson.

External links 
 Delphine Haidan on ForumOpera.com
 Delphine Haidan on OperaMusica
 Delphine Haidan on "Le Salon de musique"
 Delphine Haidan on Operabase.com
 Delphine Haidan on "La Belle Saison.com"
 Delphine Haidan discography on Discogs
 La Damnation de Faust - Delphine Haidan - D'amour l'ardente flamme on YouTube 

French operatic mezzo-sopranos
21st-century French singers
Year of birth missing (living people)
Living people
Conservatoire de Paris alumni
21st-century French women singers